The Hawke's Bay Expressway, known also as the Napier-Hastings Expressway, runs from Hawke's Bay Airport, through Napier and Hastings, and ends at Pakipaki, just south of Hastings, a total length of 24 km. It is part of State Highway 2 (SH 2).

History
When the airport at Westshore, Napier, was confirmed as Hawke's Bay's main airport in 1957, Hastings leaders objected, preferring to have an airport closer to their city. The Government set up an Airport Inquiry Committee in 1961 to settle the matter. They confirmed the Napier airport as the best option, and recommended the building of a Napier–Hastings motorway to provide quick access between the airport and Hastings.

The first section of the expressway, from Kennedy Road at Pirimai to Pakowhai Road, opened in the late 1960s, with raised approaches for a bridge over Kennedy Road being partially formed at the same time. Further construction (south of Pakowhai Road) did not start until the late 1990s. After the approaches for the Kennedy Road overbridge had stood each side of the dual carriageway from Napier to Taradale for several decades, work began to strengthen them and build the bridge in 2002. The section of expressway to Hawke's Bay Airport opened in late 2003. In 2007 the Meeanee Road interchange was built to grade separate that intersection. A new extension south of Flaxmere opened in 2011. The expressway remains single carriageway along its length at present, although has been designed to allow dual-carriageway upgrading. This became an electoral commitment by the National Party in the 2017 election as part of a series of national upgrades to roads, but they were not successful at forming a Government in the post-election coalition negotiations.

In 2019, the New Zealand Transport Agency approved renumbering of the entire expressway to SH 2. The formerly designated section of SH 2 via Napier and Hastings took a new designation of SH 51, with effect from 1 August.

Design
The Expressway is one lane in each direction, with, heading south, roundabouts at Prebensen Drive and Taradale Road and interchanges at Kennedy Road (north off, south on) and Meeanee Road (traffic lights for many years and a notorious black spot – replaced with a grade separated interchange in 2007), and roundabouts at Pakowhai Road/Links Road (previously traffic lights), Evenden Road, Omahu Road, Flaxmere Avenue/York Road, a 5-way roundabout with Maraekakaho Road/Longlands Road/Pakipaki Road and a roundabout at its terminus with SH 2 at Pakipaki. The expressway is entirely zoned at a 100 km/h limit.

Major intersections

See also
List of motorways and expressways in New Zealand

References

Roads in New Zealand
Transport in the Hawke's Bay Region